Dermapteron incerta is an extinct species of earwig in the family Protodiplatyidae. It is the only species in the genus Dermapteron.

References

External links 
 The Tree of Life's article on Archidermaptera
 A drawing of the species

Archidermaptera